Events from the year 1825 in Denmark.

Incumbents
 Monarch – Frederick VI
 Prime minister – Otto Joachim

Events

 11 July – The Danish schooner Vigilant is used for capturing the Spanish privateering schooner Adolpho north of Colibra in the West Indies.

Undated
 - A storm penetrates the narrow land mass, Agger Tange, separating Northern Jutland from the mainland Jutland for the first time since the 12th century.
 The Copenhagen Art Society is founded by a circle of the most influential figures of the Danish art world during the Danish Golden Age.

Culture

Art
 Martinus Rørbye paints the View from the Artist's Window in his parents' home at Amaliegade 45.

Births
 28 January – Moses Melchior, businessman (died 1912)
 16 April – Jacob Brønnum Scavenius Estrup, politician, prime minister of Denmark (died 1913)
 10 May – Heinrich Tønnies, photographer (died 1903)
 19 November – Jacob Kornerup, archeologist (died 1913)
 30 November – Julius Exner, painter (died 1910)

Deaths

References

 
1820s in Denmark
Denmark
Years of the 19th century in Denmark